Emil Edwin Fuchs (April 17, 1878 – December 5, 1961) was a German-born American baseball owner and executive.

Life
Fuchs was born in Hamburg, Germany to Jewish parents, Hermann and Henrietta, but grew up on the Lower East Side of New York. He received his LLB degree from New York University, and began practicing law in 1899. He was married to Oretta, and the couple had two sons (Job and Robert) and one daughter (Helen A. Meltzer). From 1902 to 1910 Fuchs was Deputy Attorney General for New York.

Career in baseball
Fuchs was the attorney for John McGraw's New York Giants when he bought the Boston Braves with Christy Mathewson and James McDonough in 1922. Mathewson was originally intended to be the principal owner. However, Mathewson's precarious health (he'd suffered a severe case of tuberculosis shortly after World War I and never recovered) forced him to turn over the team presidency to Fuchs after the 1923 season. After Jack Slattery quit as manager, Fuchs hired Rogers Hornsby to manage the rest of the 1928 season.  However, Fuchs was already in financial trouble, and was forced to sell Hornsby to the Chicago Cubs after the season.  He then took over as his own manager, finishing in last place. The Philadelphia Phillies loaned Fuchs $35,000 to keep the Braves solvent.

By 1935, he was in such dire straits that he could not afford the rent on Braves Field. When he learned that Babe Ruth's days as a New York Yankee were numbered, Fuchs bought the slugger from Jacob Ruppert. The move returned the Babe to the city where he had begun his major league career; he'd played for the Red Sox from 1914 to 1919. Ruth was named vice-president and assistant manager of the Braves, and promised a share of team profits. Fuchs also hinted that Ruth, who made no secret of his managerial ambitions, could become manager as early as 1936.  Ruth soon realized that his titles were almost meaningless, and that Fuchs was merely using him in a last-ditch effort to revive his fortunes.  Seeing a team in disarray, Ruth announced his retirement on June 1. Fuchs was forced to sell the team to minority partner Charles Adams on July 31, 1935. After selling the Braves, he resumed his law career. He died in Boston, Massachusetts.

Legacy
The Boston chapter of the Baseball Writers' Association of America annually awards the Judge Emil Fuchs Memorial Award for Long and Meritorious Service to baseball.

References

1878 births
1961 deaths
German emigrants to the United States
New York University School of Law alumni
American lawyers
American people of German-Jewish descent
Boston Braves managers
Boston Braves owners
Major League Baseball owners